Hunarbaaz: Desh Ki Shaan is an Indian Hindi-language reality television show. Produced by Frames Production, the first episode of Hunarbaaz: Desh Ki Shaan premiered on 22 January 2022. Mithun Chakraborty, Parineeti Chopra and Karan Johar as the judges and Bharti Singh (Replaced By Surbhi Chandna) & Haarsh Limbachiyaa as the hosts. The First Season was won by Akash Singh.

Hunarbaaz: Desh Ki Shaan follows the format, in which contestants audition in front of three judges and a studio audience. Up until the semifinal and final rounds, the judges decide whether or not a contestant advances in the competition. During the semifinal and final rounds, viewers vote on which contestants will advance.

Format
In contrast to other competition TV shows which feature a cast of celebrity judges, Hunarbaaz features a cast of celebrity experts and considers the viewers the judges. During each performance, the live studio audience is able to decide whether or not a contestant is sent through to the next round by using a voting panels.

While the live studio audience are considered the "judges", the judging panelists also may influence the vote with 10% of the voting power each.

Auditions
The auditions are the first round where the acts are individually called to perform. With the start of the performance, voters have the option of voting just yes or no. If an expert votes yes, another 10% is added to the tally of the contestant.

Once the contestant reaches 80% of yes votes, the contestant goes to the next round of the competition.

Overview

Judges & Hosts

Season 1

Auditions (Episode 1-8) 
 Color key

Mega Auditions (Episode 9-10) 
After Mega Auditions, Judges decided to make Top 12 to Top 14 to advance to the next round.
 Color key

Grand Premiere with Top 14 (Episode 11-12) 
This week's Judges' Votes was just an appreciation for the performances. And there was no elimination.

Mother's Special (Episode 13-14) 
Parineeti Chopra was absent for this week. At the end of all performances, the judges decided to be eliminated two acts.
 Color key

Blockbuster Weekend (Episode 15) + Holi Special (Episode 16) 
At the end of all performances, the judges decided to be eliminated three acts.
 Color key

Episode 17-18 
From this week onwards, the public votes were opened. And based on the public votes & judges scores, one act will be eliminated next week.
 Color key

Pari Ka Swayamvar (Episode 19-20) 
Based on the public votes & judges scores, one act was eliminated.
 Color key

Celebrity Special (Episode 21) + Desh Ki Farmaish (Episode 22) 
Based on the public votes & judges scores, one act was eliminated.
 Color key

Semi Finale (Episode 23-24) 
Based on the public votes & judges scores, two acts was eliminated and the season got the Top 7 acts.
 Color key

Pre Finale (Episode 25) 
No elimination this episode.
 Color key

Grand Finale (Episode 26) 
Based on the public votes & judges scores, the Top 7 acts.
 Color key

Guests

Season 2 
Season 2 was announced during season 1. Auditions were open on Voot from April 2022.

References

External links
 

Indian reality television series
Colors TV original programming
Music competitions in India
2022 Indian television seasons